St. Athanasius – Linopetra Lyceum is a public secondary education school in Limassol, Cyprus.

Established and operated the academic year 2001–2002, the school promotes the objectives of education as these were defined by the government, but also the specific objectives of the school. The school's first principal was Georgios Chantzikonstantinou, a physicist.

History
During the first academic year 2001–2002, the school operated with first-grade students who were divided into nine sections with a total number of 240, from which 97 boys and 143 girls. The total number of teachers was 33. All the special classrooms and laboratories were used, as well as the library which is still being enriched. Then in subsequent years, the school's second- and third-grade classes were operating and all necessary instruments and equipment were completed in the special class rooms and laboratories.

At November 26, 2005, with the completion of the multi-use hall, the school was inaugurated by Minister of Education and Culture Mr. Pefkios Georgiades.

In the academic year 2006–2007, due to population growth in the surrounding areas and communities, the number of students increased to 789 of whom 348 were boys and 441 girls. There are eleven first-grade sections, eleven second-grade sections and eleven third-grade sections. There are 103 academics from different disciplines, four curators and seven support staff employees.

Facilities
The school is a modern educational institution of the place and a model in building infrastructure. It has twenty-one general classrooms, nineteen special classrooms and laboratories and one support room, a library, a screening room, two basketball courts, two volleyball courts and one football court, administration offices, ancillary areas and a modern multi-purpose hall which is the jewel of the region and serves the sports and cultural activities of the school, other schools of the district, school district championships, sports bodies and sports clubs in the region.

The St. Athanasius School Board operates within the area of the school.

See also

 Education in Cyprus
 List of schools in Cyprus

2001 establishments in Cyprus
Buildings and structures in Limassol
Educational institutions established in 2001
Elementary and primary schools in Cyprus
High schools and secondary schools in Cyprus